Idriz Seferi (14 March 1847 – 25 March 1927) was an Albanian leader and guerrilla fighter (rebel). During his 56 Year long military activity, he fought in 35 battles. A member of the League of Prizren and League of Peja, he was the right-hand man of Isa Boletini, with whom he organized the 1910 Uprising against the Ottoman Empire in the Kosovo Vilayet. After the suppression of the uprising, Seferi continued warfare, in the 1912 Uprising. In the First Balkan War, Boletini and Seferi rose up against Serbia, with whom they had previously been allies to during the 1910 and 1912 Uprisings, and continued to attack Serbian posts in the subsequent occupation and initial phase of World War I (1913-1915). In the second phase of the war (1916-1918), he led troops against Bulgarian forces.

Life

Early life
Idriz Seferi was born to a Muslim family in the village of Sefer (in modern-day Preševo, south Serbia), to the north of the mountain range known as Black Mountain of Skopje, at that time part of the Ottoman Kosovo Vilayet. Malcolm notes that there is some evidence he was in fact a crypto-Catholic. He joined the Albanian national movements at an early age, being a member of the League of Prizren (est. 1878) and the League of Peja (est. 1899).

Great Eastern Crisis 
During the Great Eastern Crisis, Idriz Seferi lead a Cheta of Albanian Kachak warriors, fighting against the Ottoman authorities and the Serbo-Bulgarian gangs. In May 1875, in a battle that took place near Presheva between his Cheta and an Ottoman expedition, he was wounded in the head twice by 2 Ottoman Bullets. While Operating in South Serbia, Idriz Seferi was captured by Ottomans and imprisoned in Niš. A Ottoman court, assessing him as a dangerous person, sentenced him to 101 years in prison. The situation created by the Russo-Ottoman war of 1877-1878 influenced his release from Niš prison in November 1877. As a result of this war, the Principality of Serbia, which joined the Russian army against the Ottoman Empire, had made progress towards the south, conquering the Sanjak of Niš, Pirot, Vranje, Leskovac and had reached Gjilan. Idriz Seferi with a Cheta of Albanian Kachak warriors, was fighting against the Serbian forces up to Vranje and Leskovac.

Plav War 
During the Plav War, Idriz Seferi commanded a group 100 Albanian Warriors, which participated in the Battle of Nokšić, where the Montenegrin army suffered a heavy defeat.

Albanian-Turkish War 1881 
On January 4, 1881, during the League of Prizren-Ottoman War, Idriz Seferi and his Cheta joined Albanian forces commanded by Sulejman Vokshi which attacked Skopje. During the Battle, Seferi and his men attacked the barracks of the Ottoman army from the northeastern part of the city. The Albanian League was victorious and took control of Skopje. After the liberation of Pristina by Sulejman Vokshi, Idriz Seferi with his men liberated Kumanovo on January 19, 1881, and Preševo on January 21, 1881. From there he headed towards Gjilan, which he liberated together with the forces of Ali Ibër Neza and Mic Sokoli. Idriz Seferi resisted the forces of Dervish Pasha, who were trying to regain control over Gjilan. He participated in Battles against the Ottomans in Carraleva, Shtime and Slivovo, before withdrawing and taking refuge with his Cheta into the Karadak Mountains.

1893 Uprising 
After the end of the League of Prizren, Idriz Seferi continued his resistance against the Ottomans. Thus, in 1893, together with 100 Kachaks from Karadak, he took part in the uprising that had erupted in Drenica and Shala e Bajgorës. During the Uprising he came into contact with Haxhi Zeka, who had promised him that he would support him in his fight in the eastern provinces of Kosovo.

Macedonian Struggle 
In 1907, during the Macedonian Struggle, Idriz Seferi came into conflict with Serbian Chetniks that were operating in Eastern Kosovo. In July he fought and killed Dragoljub Nikolić and Rade Radivojević, both high ranking Serbian Chetniks, alongside their entire Četa in Pasjane and Gjylekar.

1910 Uprising
 
In early April 1910, twelve Albanian tribes of the Kosovo Vilayet led by Isa Boletini and Idriz Seferi rose up against the Ottomans. 3,000 rebels under Seferi defated Ottoman forces and captured Gjilan. From there they cut off the Pristina-Üsküp railway at Kaçanik, managing to resist the Ottoman forces at the gorge of the Kaçanik Pass. Seferi's men stopped a train carrying soldiers and supplies bound for Pristina, carried off the supplies and disarmed the soldiers. Boletini at the same time had led 2,000 rebels onto Ferizovik (Ferizaj) and Prizren. Seferi inflicted heavy losses on the Turkish army despite the fact that they were without artillery and held the pass for more than a fortnight. Seferi's men were only driven out after a desperate battle lasting thirteen hours, for they were greatly outnumbered by a Turkish army numbering 40.000 men. After the Battle at Kaçanik, Seferi and his men retreated to defensive positions near Komogllava, where Seferi himself killed 12 Turkish soldiers, but was ultimately forced to retreat to the Karadak Mountains, where he continued his resistance against the Turks, killing over 2,000 Ottoman Soldiers. The uprising was quelled by the 16,000 Ottoman troops under Shefket Turgut Pasha, however not without difficulty. By August, the Ottomans had reinstated order, and now the government took harsh measures to maintain suzerainty in the Kosovo Vilayet: all men aged 15–60 were registered (for conscription); Albanian men were disarmed and those eligible were conscripted into the Ottoman army. Boletini had given up arms after he and a Vıçıtırın state ambassador went to the Kosovo vali, who promised to meet his requests. Idriz Seferi then followed suit.

1911 Uprising

Battle of Drenogllava 
On March 5, 1911, Idriz Seferi together with Isa Boletini face a Ottoman army send by Osman Pasha to crush the Albanian rebels. The first column of the Ottoman army, led by Sadedin Bey, headed to Drenogllava in its foothills, just to be ambushed by Halim Begunca with 30-40 warriors, after which the entire Ottoman Army consisting of 2000 men marched to the ambush site, falling into a trap by Idriz Seferi, who sorrounded the entire Ottoman Army, Osman Pasha then ordered two battalions of Sahid bey to go to the aid of Sadedin Bey. Osman Pasha's maneuver was immediately understood by the Albanian rebels. Isa Boletini then cut the way for Osman Pasha's formations, thus the Ottoman army was divided into three parts and each of them was surrounded by Albanian rebels. After almost a month of heavy fighting, on May 5, Osman Pasha ordered his army to withdraw, ending the Battle with an Albanian victory.

1912 Uprising

On April 23, Hasan Prishtina's rebels revolted in the Yakova mountains, and the revolt then spread within the Kosovo Vilayet. On May 20, Albanian chiefs Bajram Curri, Isa Boletini, Riza Gjakova, Seferi, Hasan Prishtina, Nexhib Draga, and others, decided on a general armed insurrection throughout the Kosovo Vilayet. Seferi organized the rebels in the Ferizovik area, where fiercest fighting took place.

On 12 August, unable to wait any longer for the Turkish acceptance of all the demands of the League, 30,000 Albanian irregulars, the forces of chieftains Bajram Curri, Hasan Prishtina, Mehmet Pashë Dërralla, Riza bej Gjakova and Idriz Seferi, united among themselves under the command of Isa Boletini and advanced towards Üsküp (Skopje), the capital of the Vilayet of Kosovo, which they entered without encountering any resistance and took possession. As the national uprising spread throughout Kosovo and most of the north, troops were sent against the rebels, who retired to the mountains but continued to protest against the government, and in the whole region between Ipek and Mitrovica they plundered military depots, opened prisons and collected taxes from the inhabitants for the Albanian chiefs. On August 18, the moderate faction led by Prishtina managed to convince Seferi and the other leaders Isa Boletini, Bajram Curri and Riza Bey Gjakova of the conservative group to accept the agreement with the Ottomans for Albanian sociopolitical and cultural rights.

Balkan Wars
 
In the First Balkan war Seferi recruited 6,000 men from Karadak and attacked Serbian frontier posts. They were armed with Martinis and Serbian rapid-fire guns that had been supplied by Serbia during the 1909 Albanian Uprising. The Albanians did this after realising that Albanian-inhabited regions would possibly be divided between Serbia and Greece; the notion of using Serbian weapons and money against Serbia enraged the army. Due to his actions against the Serbian Army, 29 villages in Karadak were burned and Hundreds of Albanians were killed. In fact the entire Albanian population of the villages Kabash, Tërpezë, Lubisht and Gjylekar were annihilated by the Serbian Army.

World War I 
During the First World War, Idriz Seferi led a Armed Uprising in Karadak, which was occupied by Bulgaria.

Legacy
He was posthumously awarded the Hero of Kosovo-award by the Republic of Kosovo. There is a bust of him in Kaçanik.

References

Sources

1847 births
1927 deaths
19th-century Albanian military personnel
20th-century Albanian military personnel
19th-century Ottoman military personnel
20th-century Ottoman military personnel
Activists of the Albanian National Awakening
Kosovo Albanian soldiers
Rebels from the Ottoman Empire
Albanians from the Ottoman Empire
Ottoman period in the history of Kosovo
People from Preševo
Albanians in Serbia